Mountain Lakes is a commuter railroad station in the borough of Mountain Lakes, Morris County, New Jersey, United States. Serviced by New Jersey Transit's Montclair-Boonton Line, the station is the first/last station after the Morristown Line merges/diverges at Denville station. The station consists of one low-level side platform, servicing a solo track. A station depot, built by the Delaware, Lackawanna and Western Railroad, is located in the parking lot, currently serving as a restaurant known as "The Station at Mountain Lakes". 

Mountain Lakes station opened on November 10, 1912, replacing the former Fox Hill station located east of U.S. Route 46 in Denville, which had been on the freight-only Boonton Branch since 1870.

History
Mountain Lakes station was first served by Delaware, Lackawanna and Western trains in 1869, when the freight-only Boonton Branch was constructed via Paterson to bypass the passenger Morris & Essex Railroad. 

In 1912, the DL&W built a new station to replace the old Fox Hill station, breaking ground in May and opening in November. 

This building is on the Morris County Inventory of Historic Sites. It is also part of the Mountain Lakes Historic District, which was created by the New Jersey State Historical Preservation Office on July 22, 2005, and added to the National Register of Historic Places on September 7, 2005.

Station layout
Mountain Lakes has one low-level platform.

See also 
Mountain Lakes Historic District

References

External links

The Station At Mountain Lakes (Zagat.com)

Mountain Lakes, New Jersey
Railway stations in the United States opened in 1912
NJ Transit Rail Operations stations
Former Delaware, Lackawanna and Western Railroad stations
Historic district contributing properties in New Jersey
National Register of Historic Places in Morris County, New Jersey
Historic district contributing properties in Morris County, New Jersey
1912 establishments in New Jersey